Adrian Mazilu (born 13 September 2005) is a Romanian professional footballer who plays as a winger for Liga I club Farul Constanța.

Club career
Mazilu made his senior debut for Farul Constanța on 9 November 2022, coming on as a substitute and scoring the second goal in a 2–0 Cupa României away win over Rapid București. Three days later, he recorded his Liga I debut in a 1–1 draw at Chindia Târgoviște.

On 6 February 2023, Mazilu netted his first goal in the latter competition by opening the scoring in a 2–1 victory over Universitatea Craiova.

Career statistics

Club

References

External links

2005 births
Living people
Sportspeople from Constanța
Romanian footballers
Association football wingers
Liga I players
FCV Farul Constanța players
Romania youth international footballers
Romania under-21 international footballers